Pierre Piérade (died 1937) was a Belgian stage and film actor.

Selected filmography
 Little Lise (1930)
 American Love (1931)
 The Indictment (1931)
 To the Polls, Citizens (1932)
 Here's Berlin (1932)
 Narcotics (1932)
 F.P.1 (1933)
 Charlemagne (1933)
 Gold (1934)
 Rothchild (1934)
 Night in May (1934)
 A Man Has Been Stolen (1934)
 My Heart Is Calling You (1934)
 Baccara (1935)
 The Last Waltz (1936)
 Taras Bulba (1936)
 Jenny (1936)
 The Brighton Twins (1936)

References

Bibliography
 Hardt, Ursula. From Caligari to California: Erich Pommer's life in the International Film Wars. Berghahn Books, 1996.

External links

Year of birth unknown
1937 deaths
Belgian male film actors
Belgian male stage actors
Belgian emigrants to France
Actors from Charleroi
Belgian male silent film actors